Cambridge University Liberal Association (CULA) is the student branch of the Liberal Democrats for students at Cambridge University.

It is the successor to the Cambridge Student Liberal Democrats, which in turn was formed from the merger of Cambridge University Liberal Club (known as CULC, founded in 1886), and Cambridge University Social Democrats (founded in 1981) upon the creation of the Lib Dems in 1988.

History
The society has long been active in Cambridge politics, with student members playing a role in electing David Howarth on a massive 15% swing in the 2005 election, when the student turnout was unusually and noticeably higher than that in the rest of the city, and then subsequently Julian Huppert as his successor in 2010.

The older of its founder societies, the Cambridge University Liberal Club, originally existed side by side with a discussion forum for radical Cambridge politics in the late 1880s, called 'The Rainbow Circle.' Alumni of this group relocated to London after their graduation, and helped found the Bloomsbury-based radical group of that same name in 1894.

Between 1886 and 1897, the club's founder Treasurer was Oscar Browning, a Fellow of King's and three-times Liberal candidate who was also Treasurer of the Cambridge Union. The society had varying fortunes as the Liberal Party waned in the mid-twentieth century.

The society today attracts numerous high-profile speakers – in recent years, Vince Cable, Menzies Campbell, Nick Clegg, Simon Hughes, Chris Huhne, and David Steel. During the 2005 United Kingdom general election it helped organise a rally of 2,500 people with Charles Kennedy in Market Square.

Notable past speakers not normally associated with the Liberal Party have included Oscar Wilde (1889), Jerome K. Jerome (1912), W. H. Auden (1938), former Governor of Vermont Howard Dean, and Irish Prime Minister Seán Lemass (1961). A complete list of the society's past events from 1886 to the present is available here.

The society's president, from the 1988 merger, was Baroness Williams of Crosby, who had been the SDP candidate in Cambridge in 1987. She served as president until her death in 2021, after which the committee appointed former Cambridge MP Julian Huppert. Shirley Williams had previously been patron of Cambridge University Social Democrats in 1987-88.

Changing names
The society was continuously called Cambridge University Liberal Club (CULC) from 1886 until 1988 (apart from in the years 1916-9, when it suspended its activities during World War I).

In 1981, Cambridge University Social Democrats (CUSD) was formed, as the Cambridge student branch of the SDP. With the Liberals and SDP in alliance nationally, CULC and CUSD remained independent organisations, but shared close links, hosted joint events, and put up joint slates of candidates in CSU elections.

In 1988, CULC and CUSD merged into one society, as the Liberals and SDP merged into the Liberal Democrats. They initially called themselves Cambridge University Social and Liberal Democrats throughout 1988, then Cambridge University Liberal Democrats throughout 1989–90, before finally settling early in 1991 for Cambridge Student Liberal Democrats, when the society expanded to include the Cambridge campus of the city's new Anglia Polytechnic (now Anglia Ruskin University). In 2017 the name was changed again to Cambridge University Liberal Association upon the creation of a Young Liberals branch catering to young people in the city who are not members of the University of Cambridge.

Recent Campaigns 
In Autumn 2015 the society ran a campaign against proposals by Cambridgeshire County Council to switch off streetlights in Cambridge after midnight. Working with the JCR at Trinity College and the Cambridge University Students' Union, the campaign was successful. A year later, focus switched to mental health provision within the university, with the society calling for the hiring of more counsellors in the University Counselling Service.

The society actively campaigns in elections at every level. In May 2017 the society helped secure the election of Liberal Democrats to the main student divisions of Cambridgeshire County Council. They also organised regular campaign events for the general election later that year, but were less successful. In that vote the incumbent Labour MP Daniel Zeichner increased his majority to nearly 30,000 with the Liberal Democrats down 5.6 points.

In the 2018 City Council elections the Association was integrated into a successful city-wide campaign where the local party gained two seats in student wards.

Alumni
As with many Cambridge political societies, CULA and its predecessors were the first political organisations to involve many people who went on to political careers – some outside Liberal politics altogether. Notable alumni include:
Harold Abrahams, CULC member, 100m Gold Medallist, 1924 Paris Olympics
Kenneth Adam CULC President 1929–30, Controller of BBC Television 1957–61
Martin Bell, CULC Publicity Officer in 1960 and later a BBC journalist and Independent MP 1997–2001
Henry Bellingham, Baron Bellingham, CULC member, Conservative MP 1983–97 and 2001–19.
Roderic Bowen, CULC member, Liberal MP for Cardigan 1945–66
Sal Brinton, CULC member, businesswoman, Lib Dem peer, and party President 2015–9
Oscar Browning, CULC founder member and Treasurer 1886–96, historian
Vince Cable, elected CULC President in 1964 (but resigned before serving), Lib Dem MP for Twickenham 1997–2019; Secretary of State for Business 2010–5, former Chief Economist of Shell Oil, Leader of the Liberal Democrats 2017–9
Robert Chote, CU Social Democrats President in 1988, economist, Director of the Institute for Fiscal Studies 2002–10, Chairman of the Office for Budget Responsibility since 2010
Greg Clark, CU Social Democrats President in 1987, Conservative MP since 2005 and Cabinet member
Peter Cook, CULC member, satirist
Chris Davies, CULC member, MP for Littleborough and Saddleworth 1995–7, MEP for North West England 1999–2014 and 2019; former Leader of the Lib Dem group in the European Parliament
Clement Davies, CULC member, Leader of the Liberal Party 1945–56
Andrew Duff, CULC member, Lib Dem MEP for the East of England, 1999–2014
James Chuter Ede, CULC member, Liberal councillor on Epsom UDC and Surrey CC, then Labour MP and Home Secretary 
Ernest Evans, CULC President 1908–9, Liberal MP 1921–3 & 1924–43, judge
Lord Ezra, CULC Newsletter Editor 1937–8, former chairman of the National Coal Board
Hugh Foot, CULC President 1927–8, Governor of Jamaica 1951–7 and Cyprus 1957–60
Emlyn Garner Evans, CULC President 1933–4, Liberal and Liberal National MP 1950–9
Chris Grayling, CU Social Democrats Standing Committee member in 1983, Conservative MP since 2001 and Cabinet member
Sir Percy Harris, CULC member, Liberal MP 1916–8 & 1922–45; Deputy Leader of the Liberal Party 1933–45
Toby Harris, CULC member, Labour member of the GLA 2000–4
Arthur Hobhouse, CULC Secretary in 1906, founder of the National Parks
David Howarth, CULC committee member 1979–81, Lib Dem MP for Cambridge 2005–10
Simon Hughes, CULC member, Lib Dem MP for Bermondsey 1983–2015 and party President 2005–9
Julian Huppert, CSLD Chair in 1998, Lib Dem MP for Cambridge 2010–5
Henry Jackson, CULC founder member and President 1897–9, classicist
John Maynard Keynes, CULC President in 1905 and Economist
Mervyn King, CULC Treasurer in 1968, Governor of the Bank of England
David Lea, Baron Lea of Crondall, CULC President in 1960, Trades Union Congress official and Labour peer
Oliver Letwin, CULC member, Conservative MP for Dorset West 1997–2019, and former Shadow Chancellor
Selwyn Lloyd, CULC President 1926, Conservative Chancellor 1960–2 and Foreign Secretary 1955–60, Speaker of the House of Commons 1971–6
Donald MacAlister, CULC President 1901–2 & 1906, physician and academic
C. F. G. Masterman, CULC committee member, Liberal MP 1906–18, 1923–4
Arnold McNair, CULC Secretary in 1907, first President of the European Court of Human Rights 1959–65
Edwin Samuel Montagu, CULC President in 1902, Liberal MP 1906–22, cabinet minister 1915–22
Matthew Parris, CULC member and college secretary for Clare, later a Conservative MP 1979–86 and journalist
Benjamin Ramm, CSLD Chair in 2004, founding editor of The Liberal, 2004–12
Michael Ramsey, elected (but did not serve as) CULC Chair in 1926, later Archbishop of Canterbury
Andrew Rawnsley, CU Social Democrats Newsletter columnist, journalist
Dennis Robertson, CULC President 1910–1, economist
Leslie Runciman, 2nd Viscount Runciman of Doxford, CULC President 1921–2, shipbuilder
Bertrand Russell, CULC Secretary in 1892, mathematician and philosopher
Nancy Seear, Baroness Seear, CULC member, Liberal peer
Henry Sinclair, 2nd Baron Pentland CULC President 1928–9, "fourth way" spiritualist
John Tresidder Sheppard, CULC President 1907–8, classicist
Chris Smith, CULC member, Labour MP for Islington South and Finsbury, 1983–2005, and cabinet minister
Robert Egerton Swartwout, CULC President 1930–1, coxswain, author, poet, and cartoonist
Sarah Teather, CULC member, Lib Dem MP for Brent East 2003–15, and Housing spokesperson
C. P. Trevelyan, CULC committee member, Labour President of the Board of Education 1924, 1929–31
Richard Wainwright, CULC President in 1939, and Liberal MP for Colne Valley 1966–70 and 1974–87
Jim Wallace, CULC member, former Lib Dem MP 1983–2001 and Deputy First Minister of Scotland
Lord Wallace of Saltaire, CULC President in 1961, academic
Ronald Waterhouse, CULC President in 1950, High Court judge
Alan Watson, Baron Watson of Richmond, CULC President in 1963, broadcaster and Lib Dem peer

The association runs a subsidiary group, the Keynes Society, for alumni. Membership is free and lasts for life.

References

Further reading

External links
Homepage
Liberal Voice – the online version of the society's paper
The Keynes Society, for alumni of CULA – includes extensive lists of past events and officeholders of the society
Cambridge University Liberal Club minute book 1886–97, papers of Edwin Samuel Montagu, Wren Library, Trinity College, Cambridge
Cambridge University Liberal Club minute book 1897–1915, papers  of J. Conway Davies, National Library of Wales, Aberystwyth
Cambridge University Liberal Club records and papers, 1945–87, Manuscripts Department, Cambridge University Library

Organisations associated with the Liberal Democrats (UK)
Liberal Democrats
Anglia Ruskin University
Student organizations established in 1886